Max Varnel (21 March 1925 – 15 January 1996) was a French-born Australian film and television director who worked primarily in the United Kingdom and Australia.

Biography
Born Max Le Bozec in Paris, France, he was the son of the film director Marcel Varnel. He began his career as the assistant director of The Magic Box (1951) and continued in this capacity for The Card (1952), Devil Girl from Mars (1954), and The Cockleshell Heroes (1955), among others. His directing credits encompass a long string of B movies, including Moment of Indiscretion, A Woman Possessed (both 1958), Top Floor Girl, Web of Suspicion, The Child and the Killer, and Crash Drive (all 1959).

Varnel's television credits include The Vise, The Cheaters, and  Softly Softly, and The Troubleshooters in the UK, and Skippy, Glenview High, The Young Doctors, and Neighbours in Australia, having emigrated in the late 1960s.

Varnel died of a heart attack in Sydney at the age of 70.

Selected filmography
 Enter Inspector Duval (1961)
 Return of a Stranger (1961)
 Mrs. Gibbons' Boys (1962)

External links
 
 

1925 births
1996 deaths
Film directors from Paris
French television directors
French emigrants to Australia